Oakland Plantation, situated on a bluff overlooking the Cape Fear River in Carvers, Bladen County, North Carolina, was built over 200 years ago by General Thomas Brown, an American Revolutionary War patriot. It is one of a few houses of its period in North Carolina still being used today.

Listed on the National Register of Historic Places, Oakland depicts the architecture and skill of the artisans of that period. Bricks laid in Flemish bond were brought from England on sailing ships as ballast, transported up river, and unloaded by hand.

It was added to the National Register of Historic Places in 1972.

See also
List of Registered Historic Places in North Carolina

References

External links
 

Historic American Buildings Survey in North Carolina
Houses on the National Register of Historic Places in North Carolina
Houses completed in 1780
Plantation houses in North Carolina
Houses in Bladen County, North Carolina
National Register of Historic Places in Bladen County, North Carolina